"Two Is Better Than One" is a song by the American rock band Boys Like Girls from their second studio album Love Drunk (2009). The song features American singer-songwriter Taylor Swift. It was written by Martin Johnson and Swift and the song is the band's second official single from the album. On some advanced copies of the album sent to reviewers and members of the press, the song does not feature Swift, rather, Johnson handles all vocals. The song is written in the key of C major with a swift tempo of 128 beats per minute.

The track was a commercial success. By December 2011, "Two Is Better Than One" had sold 1,508,000 copies in the United States alone. It additionally received significant international airplay, reaching number 18 on the Canadian Hot 100.

Music video

An official music video was made to promote the single, directed by Meiert Avis and Jeremy Alter featuring Erik Huffman from Survivor: China and Mika Combs from The Amazing Race 15. Swift does not appear in the video, but her vocals are still heard. It shows the story of a couple's relationship (the couple being played by Huffman and Combs). The band are shown performing in an empty hall, starting with Johnson playing guitar alone before the rest of the band members walk in and join.

A music video ecard was also released for the song.

Reception
The single was sent to mainstream radio in the United States on October 19, 2009. FMQB Mainstream Releases "Two Is Better Than One"  debuted at number 92 on the Billboard Hot 100. It fell off the following week but re-entered at number 79 and rose the following week to number 64. After a few weeks, the song then reached its peak at number 18 on the chart. It has since become Boys Like Girls' third top 40 on the Hot 100 as well as Swift's twenty-first entry in the top 40. It is also the group's biggest hit to date.

By December 2011, "Two Is Better Than One" had sold 1,508,000 copies in the U.S. alone, outselling even other big Taylor Swift hits such as "Tim McGraw" and "Fifteen".  As of November 2017, the song has sold 1.7 million copies in the United States.

With both related artists receiving acclaim, the song became Boys Like Girls' second consecutive top 40 single on the Billboard Hot 100. Also, it gave Swift her twenty-first top 40 song on that chart. For the week of January 9, 2010, the song became Boys Like Girls' first top 20 single on the Billboard Hot 100, becoming their biggest hit single to date, and Swift's eleventh top 20 single.

In terms of live performances, Boys Like Girls performed this song with Malaysian songstress Misha Omar during the program MTV World Stage 2009, which was held in Sunway, Kuala Lumpur.

Accolades

Charts

Weekly charts

Year-end charts

Certifications

References

2009 singles
Boys Like Girls songs
Taylor Swift songs
Vocal collaborations
Pop ballads
Rock ballads
Music videos directed by Meiert Avis
Songs written by Martin Johnson (musician)
2009 songs
2000s ballads
Songs written by Taylor Swift